Murat-sur-Vèbre is a commune in the Tarn department and Occitanie region of southern France.

Geography
The Dourdou de Camarès River has its source in the commune.

See also
Communes of the Tarn department

References

Communes of Tarn (department)